Malavan (also Romanized as Mālavān and Mālevān) is a village in Rud Pish Rural District, in the Central District of Fuman County, Gilan Province, Iran. At the 2006 census, its population was 333, in 105 families.

References 

Populated places in Fuman County